QI (Quite Interesting) is a Czech panel show aired by TV Prima. The format is based on the UK version of QI. The program is hosted by Leoš Mareš alongside regular guest Patrik Hezucký. On the show, Leoš Mareš asks interesting, often obscure questions, the guests can score points for answers that are funny and interesting.

Episodes
As in the British version of QI, the series are themed around one letter of the alphabet.

Series A (2013) 
Twelve episodes, all beginning with the letter "A", were broadcast on TV Prima.

References

External links
 Official Site
 TV Prima 

QI
2013 Czech television series debuts
Czech comedy television series
Television game shows with incorrect disambiguation
Prima televize original programming